Moorbad Harbach is a town in the district of Gmünd in Lower Austria, Austria.

References

Cities and towns in Gmünd District